East London is a bus company operating in East London. It is a subsidiary of Stagecoach London and operates services under contract to Transport for London. The brand is not publicly used since 2010 as all buses are branded as Stagecoach, but it exists as a legal entity.

History
 
On 1 April 1989, London Buses was divided into 11 separate business units, one of which was East London. In 1994, it was sold to Stagecoach and renamed Stagecoach East London. In November 2000 Stagecoach consolidated its London operations under the Stagecoach London brand.

In August 2006, Stagecoach sold its London bus operations to Macquarie Bank. The new owner restored the East London name and Thames sailing barge logo. In October 2010, Stagecoach reacquired its old London operations with East London once again rebranded as Stagecoach London.

Livery
When privatised East London had a red livery with a grey skirt. This was replaced by Stagecoach's standard bus livery of a dark blue skirt and orange and light blue swirl at the rear with the standard white replaced by red to conform with a contractual requirements for London buses to be 80% red. After the sale to Macquarie Bank, an all red livery was introduced.

Garages
East London operates eight bus garages.

Ash Grove (HK)
Formally HCT Group, Stagecoach took over on the 27th of August 2022, from the Bus Depot which Stagecoach share with Arriva, they operate bus routes: 26, 309, 388, 394, D6, W5, W13, N26, N550, N551.

Barking (BK)

As at March 2019, Barking garage operated routes 62, 145, 167, 169, 173, 179, 362, 366 and 462. On 27 August 2017, route 5 passed to Blue Triangle. On 30 March 2019, route 396 passed to Blue Triangle.

History
Barking garage was opened in 1924 by the London General Omnibus Company to cater for the increased demand from the new housing estates springing up in Becontree.

Barking is remembered by many enthusiasts as being the last garage to operate AEC Regent III RTs on 7 April 1979. In 1992, it was intended to close this garage, along with those at North Street (Romford) and Seven Kings, in favour of a new super-garage at Chadwell Heath. As it turned out, this super-garage was not built due to the land for it being contaminated, and only Seven Kings closed. Thus, by 1994, Barking found itself with a scheduled requirement for 109 buses, mainly Titans and Optare Deltas.

Bow (BW)

As at July 2020, Bow garage operated routes 8, 25, 205, 425, N8, N25, N205, N277. On 27 August 2017, routes 15 and N15 passed to Blue Triangle.

History
Opened as a tram depot by the north Metropolitan Tramways Company in 1908 on land once occupied by an asylum, it was converted to operate trolley buses in 1939. It was converted to motor bus operation in 1959 including the installation of large overground fuel tanks. Shortly after its conversion, it took up the allocation of the nearby Clay Hall garage when that closed.

The garage has had a long association with the AEC Routemaster, receiving its first examples in the early 1960s, some of which remained right up until August 2004 when the type was withdrawn from route 8. In December 2007, Bow took over the running of Heritage route 15 from the closed Waterden Road garage until this moved to West Ham in June 2009.

Leyton (T)

As at March 2019, Leyton garage operated routes 55, 56, 215, 257, 275, and N55.

History
Leyton garage was built in 1912 by the London General Omnibus Company to replace an existing garage acquired from London Metropolitan, and was in an ideal position to benefit from developing areas. During the Second World War the garage suffered bomb damage but was not rebuilt until a major renovation in 1955.

The garage was the first to receive post-war AEC Regent III RTs, 78 of which were allocated by 1947, with a further 30 added for the trolleybus conversion program in 1959. RT operation at Leyton ended in 1972.

When the London buses subsidiaries were established, Leyton was taken up by the London Forest subsidiary. In 1991, plans to close the garage were a contributing factor in strike action by all of the company's staff, which ultimately resulted in the winding-up of London Forest, with Leyton garage passing to East London.

Leyton was the first garage for another bus type in 1999, when Stagecoach began taking delivery of low-floor Alexander ALX400 bodied Dennis Trident 2s. On 25 February 2017, the route 48 was transferred to Arriva London. On 14 October 2017, the route 257 was transferred from Go-Ahead London (London General)

Lea Interchange (LI)
As at May 2022, Lea Interchange garage operated routes 58, 135, 236, 262, 308, 339, 473, 488, 678, D8, W14.

History
Lea Interchange was opened by First London in 2007 to replace its Waterden Road, Stratford garage that closed as part of the development of the Olympic Park for the 2012 Olympic and Paralympic Games. It was sold in June 2013 to Tower Transit and in May 2022 to Stagecoach London.

Romford (NS)
As at March 2019, Romford garage operated routes 86, 247, 256 (Morning Peak), 294, 296, 365 (Overnight Only), 496, 498, 499 and N86.

History
Romford garage is also called North Street (hence its NS code) as London Transport already had a 'country bus' garage: Romford (London Road). It was opened in 1953 to take the strain off nearby Hornchurch garage, and also to cope with the new Harold Hill estate. Built in the post-war style of a London Underground station, it was initially able to house 115 buses, although only 67 were allocated when opened. The allocation grew to 90 by 1958.

In 1992, along with Barking and Seven Kings (which did subsequently close although due to loss of routes by competitive tender), the garage was earmarked for closure in favour of a new super-garage at Chadwell Heath, which ultimately was never built. By 1994, Romford was allocated 84 buses, mainly Leyland Titans. In 2004 the allocation had dropped slightly to 76, although with a good year of tender wins in 2005 the garage is up to full capacity. The garage was home to East London Coaches private hire operation from 1990 to 2005 when the section moved to the now closed Waterden Road garage. On 2 March 2013 Route 86 was partially transferred from this garage to West Ham (WH).

West Ham (WH)
As at March 2019, West Ham garage operated routes 97, 238, 241, 277, 323, 330, 474 and D3. On 27 August 2017, route 115 passed to Blue Triangle. On 30 March 2019, routes 262 and 473 passed to Tower Transit.

History

The present West Ham garage was opened in February 2008 as the replacement for Stratford garage. Whilst construction work was underway, all major engineering work on its buses was carried out at Rainham. The garage became fully operational in November 2009 taking over its own maintenance. The new garage is able to hold over 350 buses. It is the biggest bus garage in England and is the new location for Stagecoach London's head office and training centre.

Walthamstow Avenue (AW)
In November 2016, HCT Group opened a second garage in Walthamstow. This was also included in the sale of CT Plus to Stagecoach London. As of February 2021, Walthamstow Avenue operates routes 20, 385, 397, 616, W11, W12, W16 and W19.

Former garages

Stratford (SD)
Stratford garage closed in February 2008 with operations transferred to West Ham to allow the site to be redeveloped for the 2012 Olympic Games.

History
Stratford garage opened in 1992. It was a large yard on an old industrial estate by the River Lea, opposite the Hackney garage which was owned by First London. It was originally called Bow Midibus Base because it housed midibuses which had been previously based at Bow and West Ham. It also operated buses with rooftop flashing beacons for the London City Airport contract.

One vehicle from this garage was destroyed in the London bombings of 7 July 2005. Thirteen passengers were killed, but the driver of the bus, George Psaradakis, escaped serious injury and was able to return to work a few weeks later. The bus was replaced in October 2005 by the first Alexander Dennis Enviro400 off the production line, which was named "Spirit of London" and it is now been withdrawn

Waterden Road (WA)

Waterden Road garage closed in December 2007 to allow the site to be redeveloped for the 2012 Olympic Games.

History
Waterden Road opened early in 2004 with an allocation for approximately 100 buses, mainly articulated Mercedes-Benz Citaros for route 25. By 2005, East London had relocated both its training centre and its private hire fleet to this garage. The private hire fleet was disbanded in 2007.

The garage had been open for less than four years when Olympics work forced its closure, the training centre moving to West Ham.

Upton Park (U)

History
Prior to West Ham being built it was the largest garage in the east end of London; Upton Park was opened by the LRCC in 1907 but was requisitioned for the war effort in 1915 and was not returned to use until 1919. In 1931, it was totally revamped and enlarged to create a capacity of just over 200 buses. In 1988, the garage operated the X15 Beckton Express using ex-Green Line AEC Routemaster RMCs. The service was a trial, and sold newspapers to commuters on board.

On 16 September 2011, Upton Park garage closed. There were no driver redundancies as a result of the garage closure as they were moved with the routes to other locations. The site was sold for redevelopment as social housing by Telford Homes in November 2014.

Fleet
As at May 2015, East London had a peak vehicle requirement of 607 buses.

References

External links

Stagecoach London website

London bus operators
Stagecoach Group bus operators in England
Transport companies established in 1989
1989 establishments in England